The Rugby League Heritage Centre was formerly located in the basement of the George Hotel, Huddersfield, West Yorkshire, England. It was the first rugby league heritage museum and was significantly influenced by Sky Sports presenter and former Great Britain international Mike Stephenson.

History

Twenty-one northern clubs held a meeting and by a majority of 20 to 1 voted to secede from the Rugby Football Union to set up their own Northern Rugby Football Union at the George Hotel, Huddersfield on August 29, 1895. In 1922 this became the Rugby Football League.

The Rugby League Heritage Centre was opened at the George Hotel on 30 August 2005 by former players Billy Boston, Neil Fox and Mick Sullivan. The centre featured displays of memorabilia, including rare jerseys, medals, caps, programmes and photographs owned by Mike Stephenson.

In 2013, the hotel was sold. The sporting charity, Rugby League Cares, was given £97,200 from the Heritage Lottery Fund to secure the collection. The collection was put on tour and in storage until a new location could be arranged.

In 2016, plans were announced for a new National Rugby League Museum, based in nearby Bradford, to succeed the Heritage Centre.

See also
 Webb Ellis Rugby Football Museum

References

External links
 Gillette Rugby League Heritage Centre

Rugby league in England
Sport in Huddersfield
Buildings and structures in Huddersfield
Tourist attractions in Huddersfield
Sports museums in England
History of rugby league
Museums established in 2005
Museums in West Yorkshire
Rugby league museums and halls of fame
Defunct museums in England